Chief Ojo Maduekwe  (May 6, 1945 – June 29, 2016) was a Nigerian politician of Igbo origin, from Ohafia, Abia State.

Early life and education 
He was educated at the University of Nigeria, Nsukka and graduate with a law degree in 1972.

Political career 
He was appointed Foreign Minister of Nigeria on July 26, 2007 by President Umaru Yar'Adua. 
He left office in March 2010 when Acting President Goodluck Jonathan dissolved his cabinet.
He was National Secretary of the ruling political party, the Peoples Democratic Party (PDP). He worked as the deputy director of PDP presidential campaign 2011 Goodluck/Sambo ticket. He was nominated for SGF, but was subsequently dropped following criticism  by eastern people.

Previously, Maduekwe had been appointed Culture and Tourism minister by President Olusegun Obasanjo in 1999.
He was appointed Minister of Transport in 2001. In this position, he advocated for greater use of bicycles, although critics said that the roads were unsafe for cyclists. Maduekwe himself was pushed into a ditch by a bus while he was cycling to work.

Trivia
 Maduekwe and former NDDC Chairman, Onyema Ugochukwu were fraternity brothers at the University of Nigeria

References

1945 births
2016 deaths
University of Nigeria alumni
Igbo politicians
National Working Committee people
Foreign ministers of Nigeria
Transport ministers of Nigeria
Federal ministers of Nigeria
Abia State politicians
Peoples Democratic Party (Nigeria) politicians